Iowa Department of Public Safety (DPS) is a state law enforcement agency of Iowa, headquartered in Des Moines.

Divisions
 Iowa State Patrol
 Division of Criminal Investigation
Division of Intelligence & Fusion Center
Division of Narcotics Enforcement
State Fire Marshal
Administrative Services

References

External links
 Iowa Department of Public Safety

State law enforcement agencies of Iowa
State agencies of Iowa